Mohammed Al Najjar (born 1956) is the Jordanian Minister of Water and Irrigation. He was appointed as minister on 7 March 2021.

Education 
Al Najjar holds a Bachelor of Civil Engineering (1981) from the Krasnodar University and a Master of Environmental Engineering (1988) from the Newcastle University.

References 

Living people
1956 births
21st-century Jordanian politicians
Alumni of Newcastle University
Government ministers of Jordan